Trichopsomyia apisaon, the black-haired psyllid-killer, is a common species of syrphid fly observed all across North America. Hoverflies can remain nearly motionless in flight. The adults are also known as flower flies for they are commonly found on flowers from which they get both energy-giving nectar and protein-rich pollen. Larvae when known are psyllid, aphid and Phylloxera predators.

References 

Diptera of North America
Hoverflies of North America
Pipizinae
Insects described in 1849
Taxa named by Francis Walker (entomologist)